These are the official results of the Men's 1,500 metres event at the 1986 European Championships in Stuttgart, West Germany, held at Neckarstadion on 29 and 31 August 1986.

Medalists

Final

Qualifying heats

Participation
According to an unofficial count, 29 athletes from 15 countries participated in the event.

 (1)
 (2)
 (1)
 (1)
 (3)
 (3)
 (1)
 (1)
 (2)
 (3)
 (3)
 (2)
 (1)
 (3)
 (2)

See also
 1982 Men's European Championships 1,500 metres (Athens)
 1983 Men's World Championships 1,500 metres (Helsinki)
 1984 Men's Olympic 1,500 metres (Los Angeles)
 1987 Men's World Championships 1,500 metres (Rome)
 1988 Men's Olympic 1,500 metres (Seoul)
 1990 Men's European Championships 1,500 metres (Split)

References

 Results

1500
1500 metres at the European Athletics Championships